East Saint Louis Senior High School is the only high school located in East St. Louis, Illinois. The school serves about 1,438 students in grades 9 to 12 in the East Saint Louis Public Schools district. It was featured in the Jonathan Kozol book Savage Inequalities. In 1998, East St. Louis Lincoln High School consolidated with East  St. Louis High.

Sports 
East St. Louis Senior High School won the 2008 Class 7A football state championship against Geneva High School. The Flyers have a storied history in Illinois high school football, having won the state championship over a half-dozen times and the national championship twice. The Flyers beat Prairie Ridge in 2022 for the Class 6A football title. From 1976 to the beginning of the 1995 season, the Flyers' coach was Bob Shannon. Two years of Flyers football during that period were the subject of a book, The Right Kind of Heroes.

The Flyers compete in the Southwestern Conference.

Notable alumni 
Hank Bauer, former MLB right fielder (New York Yankees, Kansas City Athletics) and manager (Kansas City Athletics, Baltimore Orioles); 8x World Series champion; member of Baltimore Orioles Hall of Fame.
Ed Blake, former MLB pitcher for the Cincinnati Reds and the Kansas City Athletics
 Rose Marion Boylan, (ca. 1875-1947) known professionally as Rose Marion, newspaper reporter and clubwoman
 Walter Boyne, author of 32 books and 500 articles about aviation; was the director of the National Air & Space Museum
Homer Bush, former MLB second baseman; 1998 World Series Champion
Jimmy Connors, tennis Hall of Famer
Bryan Cox, former NFL linebacker; NFL assistant coach
Al Dixon, former NFL tight end
William Dollar, one of the nation's leading performers in the terpsichorean art of ballet
Thomas L. Fekete, Illinois state representative and lawyer
Larry Gladney, Professor of Physics, Yale University, New Haven, Connecticut
Kerry Glenn, former NFL cornerback
Dawn Harper-Nelson, Olympic hurdler; Gold medalist in 100-meter hurdles at 2008 Summer Olympics
Dana Howard, former NFL linebacker; 1994 Dick Butkus Award winner; 2017 College Football Hall of Fame inductee.
Sam Jethroe, oldest baseball player to win "Rookie of the Year" award with the Boston Braves
Shelby Jordan, former NFL offensive tackle for the New England Patriots and the Los Angeles Raiders
Al Joyner, Olympic gold medal winner in the 1984 Los Angeles Olympics
Bennie Lewis, small forward for Frankston Blues of Australia's SEABL. 
Jean Madeira, opera mezzo-soprano.
Joe May, gospel singer known as the "Thunderbolt of the Midwest"
Darius Miles, former NBA power forward
Victor Scott, former NFL defensive back
Bob Turley, former MLB pitcher; 1958 Cy Young Award winner, World Series MVP, and AL wins leader.
Bill Walker, former MLB pitcher with the New York Giants and St. Louis Browns; 2x NL ERA leader.
Johnny Wyrostek, former MLB outfielder; 2x MLB All-Star with Cincinnati Reds.
Marion Lee Wilde, class of 1939, one of the Wilde Twins. Movie actress 1942-1949.
Mary Lynn Wilde, class of 1939, one of the Wilde Twins. Movie actress 1942-1953.
Kellen Winslow, class of 1975, former NFL tight end for San Diego Chargers; NFL and College Football Hall of Fame inductee.

References

External links 
East St. Louis Sr. High School page at East St. Louis Public Schools

Public high schools in Illinois
East St. Louis, Illinois
Schools in St. Clair County, Illinois